The 1998 Princeton Tigers football team was an American football team that represented Princeton University during the 1998 NCAA Division I-AA football season. In its inaugural year at Princeton Stadium, the Tigers finished fourth in the Ivy League.

In their 12th year under head coach Steve Tosches, the Tigers compiled a 5–5 record and outscored opponents 229 to 165. Dan Swingos was the team captain.

Princeton's 4–3 conference record placed fourth in the Ivy League standings. The Tigers outscored Ivy opponents 156 to 111. 

Princeton's first game of the season was the opener for its new home field, Princeton Stadium, built on the site of the former Palmer Stadium on the university campus in Princeton, New Jersey. Because of the demolition and construction project, Princeton had played its 1997 season entirely on the road, making the September 19 home opener its first home game in a year and a half.

Schedule

References

Princeton
Princeton Tigers football seasons
Princeton Tigers football